King of the Royal Mounted is a 1936 American drama film directed by Howard Bretherton and written by Earle Snell and Don Swift. The film stars Robert Kent, Rosalind Keith, Alan Dinehart, Arthur Loft, Grady Sutton and Frank McGlynn Sr. The film was released on September 11, 1936, by 20th Century Fox.

Plot

Cast    
Robert Kent as RCMP Sgt. King
Rosalind Keith as Helen Lawton 
Alan Dinehart as Frank Becker
Arthur Loft as John Snead
Grady Sutton as RCMP Const. Slim Callum
Frank McGlynn Sr. as Henry Dundas
Jack Luden as RCMP Const. Smith
Lawrence Underwood as Charley
Artie Ortego as Indian Joe

References

External links
 

1936 films
American drama films
1936 drama films
20th Century Fox films
Films directed by Howard Bretherton
American black-and-white films
1930s English-language films
1930s American films